"Maohi" can also refer to the indigenous people of French Polynesia, also known as Tahitians.

In Tahiti and adjacent islands, the term Maohi (Mā’ohi in Tahitian language) refers to the ancestors of the Polynesian peoples.

The term can also be a reference to normal, everyday people, just as Māori is accepted among native or indigenous people in New Zealand or the Cook Islands as the way they describe themselves. Te Ao Maohi – the Maohi world – as an expression coined by Oscar Temaru gives an example of this.

History 
The Ma'ohi people first arrived to what is known today as French Polynesia over 2,300 years ago. The Ma'ohi include not only Tahiti but 17 surrounding islands in French Polynesia. It wasn't until the 18th century that external influence was introduced to the Ma'ohi people. In 1880 France seized control of Tahiti and its surrounding islands.

La Culture Ma'ohi 

La Culture Ma'ohi is a culture movement by the Ma'ohi people to rediscover their culture after colonization by the French in the mid-nineteenth century. Most traditions from the Ma'ohi culture were lost due to colonization, and diverse influences from neighboring islands such as the Marquesas, the Austral and the Cook Islands, helped to reconstruct post contact Tahitian culture. Reinterpretation of traditions such as art and dance as well as reconstructions of traditional Marae's played an important role in recreating a cultural identity for Tahitians. It wasn't until the 1950s that the reconstruction of these traditions began, due to an overall lack of knowledge about Tahitian culture. La Culture Ma'ohi is a way for Tahitian politicians to heighten the awarenesses of the cultural past as well as create and identity for the future of Tahiti.

Dance 

Traditional dance was one piece of the Ma'ohi culture that was lost due to colonization by the French. Historical reenactments of the dances, the costumes and the chants had to be reconstructed due to their being no feasible way of knowing what the authentic creations were to begin with. The Heiva is a traditional annual dance event that started in the 1950s as a way to bring traditional Tahitian dance back into Tahitian culture.

Tattooing 
Tattoos in Tahiti have become an accepted symbol of Ma'ohi culture. Tattoos demonstrate a commitment to Tahitian cultural identity and can be seen has decorative. Those that are young and involved in other aspects of Tahitian culture such as dance are the majority of people that have tattoos. The practice of tattooing also exists in other islands known as the Polynesian Triangle.

See also
Unrepresented Nations and Peoples Organization

References

Tahiti and Society Islands mythology